The Harvest is a science fiction novel by American-Canadian writer Robert Charles Wilson, first published in 1992.

Plot
The first aliens to contact Earth, mysterious beings called the Travellers, bring the gift of immortality to those humans who choose to accept it—and the price it exacts. While most people leap at the chance to live forever, even at the cost of their humanity, a few hold on to their mortality and find themselves the inheritors of a strangely transformed future.

External links
Page at Internet Speculative Fiction Database

1992 American novels
1992 science fiction novels
Canadian science fiction novels
Novels by Robert Charles Wilson
Dystopian novels
Bantam Spectra books